Xylogalacturonan beta-1,3-xylosyltransferase (xylogalacturonan xylosyltransferase, XGA xylosyltransferase) is an enzyme with systematic name UDP-D-xylose:xylogalacturonan 3-beta-D-xylosyltransferase. This enzyme catalyses the following chemical reaction

 Transfers a xylosyl residue from UDP-D-xylose to a D-galactose residue in xylogalacturonan, forming a beta-1,3-D-xylosyl-D-galactose linkage.

This enzyme is involved in plant cell wall synthesis.

References

External links 
 

EC 2.4.2